Ephistemus  is a genus comprising several species of beetles. It is contained in the family Cryptophagidae. Species within this genus include the silken fungus beetle (Ephistemus globulus) and E. reitteri.

References

Cryptophagidae
Cucujoidea genera